Nachstern is the name given to the network of night-time bus routes serving the city of Luzern, Switzerland and its surrounding areas. Most of the routes are operated by VBL, although some are operated by other companies.

History
The first night-time route in Luzern was started in 1997 and operated between Luzern and Engelberg, although the Nachstern network itself was not launched until 2000, when lines N1/2/3/4 were introduced.  Initially, lines N1/2 were operated by trolleybuses, however today all routes on the network are operated by diesel buses.  The network has been extended gradually since 2003, and currently there are 12 lines on the network, operated by 6 companies.  The network is sponsored by local radio station Radio Pilatus

Routes

External links
Official site
VBL
Postauto
Auto AG Schwyz
Rottal Auto AG
Auto AG Rothenburg
Zentralbahn

Bus routes in Switzerland
Transport in Switzerland
Public transport in Switzerland